The Borgholm Castle built 1669-1681 for Queen Hedvig Eleonora, and designed by Nicodemus Tessin the Elder. Located in the vicinity is also Solliden Palace, summer home to the royal family.  The castle was once integrated with the Halltorps royal estate.

The agricultural landscape of southern Öland, which is known as the Stora Alvaret or Great Alvar, has been entered as a site of the UNESCO World heritage program. Features of this are the many windmills left standing and the special geological landscape called Alvar.  This low lying limestone plateau is the habitat of a number of rare species of endemic wildflowers and butterflies.

Öland